Xolocotzia is a monotypic genus of flowering plants in the family Verbenaceae containing the single species Xolocotzia asperifolia. This plant, a shrub or small tree, is native to Mexico and Honduras; it has been collected only once in the latter.

This species is grouped with the genus Petrea in a small clade which is a sister group to the rest of the family. Plants of these two genera have fleshy fruits and showy sepals that are longer than the flower corollas at the center. It is possible that this species may be added to genus Petrea at some point, but more analysis is required to support such a move.

References

Verbenaceae
Flora of Honduras
Flora of Mexico
Endangered plants
Endangered biota of Mexico
Monotypic Lamiales genera
Taxonomy articles created by Polbot
Verbenaceae genera